I'm Travelling On is the 11th studio album by British soul singer Ruby Turner, released in 2009.

Track listing
 "All Aboard / This Train" (4:32)	 	 
 "Get Away Jordan" (2:55)	 	 
 "Old Ship of Zion" (3:18)	 	 
 "I'm Travelling On" (4:21)	 	 
 "Live So God Can Use You" (1:58)	 	 
 "Strength, Power and Love" (4:15)	 	 
 "The Love of God" (2:31)	 	 
 "Oh Mary Don't You Weep" (2:58)	 	 
 "Lord I Thank You" (3:00)	 	 
 "Jesus on the Mainline" (2:58)	 	 
 "Lead Me, Guide Me" (3:33)	 	 
 "Take My Hand, Precious Lord" (3:11)	 	 
 "Stand By Me" (2:09)	 	 
 "Precious Memories" (2:16)	 	 
 "The Love of God" {Band} (2:32)
 "This Train" (Ash Howes Radio Mix) (3:16)

Personnel

Musicians
Ruby Turner – vocals, backing vocals

Production

Ruby Turner albums
2009 albums